TV Casper and Company was an American comic book series, published by Harvey Comics. The series ran from August 1963 to April 1974; in all, 46 issues were published.

TV Casper and Company featured stories from Harvey Comics' stable of characters, focusing on those characters that appeared in theatrical cartoons produced by Paramount Pictures' "Famous Studios." The primary characters featured were Casper, Spooky, Baby Huey, Little Audrey, Herman and Katnip, and Buzzy the Funny Crow. Most of these characters usually appeared in a one-page strip at the beginning of each issue. In many instances, the image of the cover of each issue was featured in this one-pager.

Many issues of the series contained reprints. The series started out as a quarterly, then became a bi-monthly in the late 1960s. The series was published as a "Giant-Size" comic, with 68 pages in each issue (through # 31 in April 1971) and 52 pages from issues 32 (August 1971) to 46 (April 1974).

The series was canceled in 1974 during a general purge of Harvey Comics titles. Numerous other Casper titles had been canceled in 1973.

Comics publications